"The Egg" is a short story published by American writer Andy Weir, originally published on his website Galactanet on August 15, 2009. It is Weir's most popular short story, and has been translated into over 30 languages by readers. The story follows a nameless 48-year-old man who discovers the "meaning of life" after he dies.

Summary 
The story is about the main character, who is referred to as "you" (in the second person), and God, who is "me" (in the first person). You, a 48-year-old man who dies in a car crash, meets God, the narrator, who says that you have been reincarnated many times before, and that you are next to be reincarnated as a Chinese peasant girl in 540 AD. God then explains that you are, in fact, constantly reincarnated across time, and that all human beings who have ever lived and will ever live are incarnations of you. You remark about being Abraham Lincoln, Adolf Hitler, and Jesus. God adds that you were also once John Wilkes Booth, every Holocaust victim and every person who followed Jesus. 

God explains that in fact there are other godlike beings elsewhere, and that you too will one day become a god. The entire universe was created as an egg for the main character (all of humanity), and once you have lived every human life ever, you will be born as a god. The reason God created the universe was for the main character, you, to understand this point: "Every time you victimized someone...you were victimizing yourself. Every act of kindness you’ve done, you’ve done to yourself. Every happy and sad moment ever experienced by any human was, or will be, experienced by you."

History 
In a 2015 interview with the Craftsman Founder Podcast, Weir discussed his motivation for writing The Egg, among other topics. In the interview, Weir stated that he "wanted to write a story where life was fair after all". According to Weir, most religions have their own take on the proverb "what goes around comes around" and revolve around this idea in some way. When asked why he chose to have one soul reincarnating constantly across time instead of linearly forward though time, Weir said that the only way his idea of everyone being one soul would work was if reincarnation could happen across time. Weir stated that he wrote the story quickly, saying "I banged it out in 40 minutes and posted it, and that was it." He did not expect the traction that the story got after it was published.

In popular culture 
The rapper Logic used "The Egg" as inspiration for his album Everybody released in 2017, re-imagined in the interlude track "Waiting Room" and featuring Neil DeGrasse Tyson as God.

See also 
 Open individualism
 Advaita Vedanta
 Hiranyagarbha
 Panpsychism
 Cosmic egg
 Subjective idealism
 Metaphysical solipsism

References

External links 
 The Egg (full text)

Fiction about God
2009 short stories
Philosophical fiction
American short stories
Short stories adapted into films

Works adapted into animated films
Works by Andy Weir